Brunsberg may refer to:

People 
Arlo Brunsberg (born 1940), American professional baseball player
Victoria Brunsberg (born 1991), Australian team handball player

Places 
Brunsberg (Harburg), a high hill in northern Germany